William Leech (15 July 1875 – 24 November 1934) was an English footballer who played for Burslem Port Vale, Leicester Fosse, Plymouth Argyle, Stoke and Tottenham Hotspur. He made over 300 competitive appearances in a career lasting over 11 years. A left-half, his greatest achievement was to help Leicester to win promotion out of the Second Division in 1906–07.

Career
Leech played for local sides Newcastle White Star and Newcastle Swifts before joining London side Tottenham Hotspur. He left "Spurs" in June 1899 to join Burslem Port Vale back in his native Staffordshire. He made his Vale debut in a 2–0 loss to Leicester Fosse at Filbert Street on 30 September, and became a regular first team player from the following month. He made 26 Second Division and four FA Cup appearances in the 1899–1900 campaign, scoring once in a 4–0 win over Chesterfield at Saltergate (Howard Harvey claimed the other three).

After one season at Burslem Port Vale, Leech joined local rivals Stoke in the First Division, and he took over the centre half position from the injured Edward Parsons. He played in 36 matches for the "Potters" in 1900–01, scoring twice against Derby County and West Bromwich Albion. His run in the first team was ended in February 1902 after breaking his leg against Nottingham Forest in the FA Cup, and he was allowed to leave the club.

It took him more than a year to recover from his injury, and in July 1903 he signed for Southern League side Plymouth Argyle. He spent three seasons with the "Pilgrims", making between 49 and 52 appearances in each season. In total, he scored seven goals in 151 league and cup games at Home Park. The club's handbook at the time described him as "No comment needed! The one and only Leech. A pocket champion, admired on the stand side and elsewhere in the Three Towns. 'Nuf sed'." He then returned to the Football League with Leicester Fosse, becoming a first team regular in the 1906–07 and 1907–08 campaigns, as the "Foxes" won promotion out of the Second Division in 1908. He then became an assistant trainer at the club, until his retirement in 1911.

Career statistics
Source:

Honours
Leicester City
 Football League Second Division second-place promotion: 1907–08

References

Sportspeople from Newcastle-under-Lyme
English footballers
Association football midfielders
Tottenham Hotspur F.C. players
Port Vale F.C. players
Stoke City F.C. players
Plymouth Argyle F.C. players
Leicester City F.C. players
English Football League players
Southern Football League players
Western Football League players
Association football coaches
Leicester City F.C. non-playing staff
1875 births
1934 deaths